Zayed Salem Saleh (born 25 April 1991) is an Emirati footballer. He currently plays as a midfielder .

Career
He formerly played for Al-Wahda, Dubai, Al Urooba, and Khor Fakkan.

References

External links
 

1991 births
Living people
Emirati footballers
Al Wahda FC players
Dubai CSC players
Al Urooba Club players
Khor Fakkan Sports Club players
UAE Pro League players
UAE First Division League players
Association football midfielders
Place of birth missing (living people)